Dugi Rat is a municipality in Croatia in the Split-Dalmatia County. It has a population of 7,092 (2011 census), 98% of whom are Croats. In Croatian dugi rat means "long cape".

References

External links 

Populated places in Split-Dalmatia County
Municipalities of Croatia
Populated coastal places in Croatia